Juan Thomas Cabrelles (18 December 1926 – 18 January 2017) was a Spanish sports shooter. He competed in the 25 metre pistol event at the 1964 Summer Olympics.

Notes

References

External links
 
 
 
 

1926 births
2017 deaths
Spanish male sport shooters
Olympic shooters of Spain
Shooters at the 1964 Summer Olympics
Sportspeople from Barcelona
20th-century Spanish people